Claudia do Val is a professional Brazilian jiu-jitsu practitioner. She has won the World Jiu-Jitsu Championship three times, holding each title in a different category.

She was three times ranked No.1 IBJJF competitor in the Gi,2018/2019 season and 2019/2020 season, and 2020/2021 season; as well as No.1 IBJJF NoGi competitor for the 2018, and 2019 , and 2020 seasons.

Do Val won the IBJJF grand Slam in 2018, which consists of the biggest tournaments of the year: European Championship, Pan Jiu-Jitsu Championship, Brazilian National Championship, and the World Championship.

Along with the success in the biggest Jiu jitsu competitions, she also holds over 60 gold medals from the smaller tournaments (all in the black belt level).

Biography

Cláudia do Val started her Martial arts career in 2006 when she started training judo under the influence of her younger brother. After a few years of practicing judo she decided to start Jiu Jitsu at the age of 21.

Not having competed much in the lower belts she came up as a surprise to the bjj community when she showed up as a brown belt winning the European Championship and the World Championship in 2016.
She was awarded her black belt in December 2016; by then, given her success in competitions that year she was believed to have equal success next year in the black belt competitions.

Making her debut as a black belt in 2017 she won the European Championship, the Brazilian National Championship and the World Championship on the first try.
That same year she was nominated for the Flograppling award of black belt female of the year.

Following her success of the previous year, she had an even more successful 2018; where she won the IBJJF grand Slam, which consists of the biggest tournaments of the year : European Championship, Pan Jiu-Jitsu Championship, Brazilian National Championship and the World Championship, which means she also won for the second consecutive year the Brazilian Jiu-Jitsu Federation Black Belt World, the most important title in the jiu jitsu world. She also finished the 2017/2018 season as the 2nd in the Ranking IBJJF in the Gi.
Still that year, for the first time, she competed in the Master Worlds tournament, having only become eligible that year to compete in the masters' division (for people with 30 years or above). The tournament is held in Las Vegas and happens at the same time and venue as the IBJJF Las Vegas Open. Do Val competed in all the categories both her weight division and the Absolute and in two days won 6 gold medals.
Soon after Las Vegas, do Val was in Tokyo where she competed at the Asian Open Championship and took two gold medals for her weight category and Open Class.
She went back to Brazil in time to win the São Paulo Open tournament, and set again on another trip for more tournaments in Europe, where she participated in 5 tournaments, in a different country each, and brought with her 20 medals.

By December, she reached the end of the IBJJF NoGi Season as the No.1 in the Ranking.
Again by the end of the year she was nominated for the Floggrappling award of black belt female of the year.

Starting 2019 she set up a record winning a match at the Manila Open with 91 points on the scoreboard and submitting with a few seconds to go.
She was invited for an interview with CNN Philippines for the program sports desk.
She was also sought by the magazines Her World and Shape while in Singapore, for interviews.
By June that year she won her third consecutive title at the Brazilian Jiu-Jitsu Federation Black Belt World, this time at the super heavy weight division, holding then 3 World Titles, each in a different weight category 
She also reached the end of the IBJJF competitive Gi season (2018/2019) as the first in the ranking 

She also won for the second time the Master World Championship in Las Vegas. 
Like the previous year, do Val set on another trip to Europe, only this is time she participated in 10 tournaments, each in a different country, bringing back home 35 medals, from 2 months work.

And for the second time she also finished No.1 in the ranking IBJJF NoGi season.

Championships and accomplishments

IBJJF World Championships:
2016  Brown Belt Heavy:  
2017  Black Belt Heavy: 
2018 Black Belt Medium Heavy:  
2019 Black Belt Super Heavy:  
IBJJF Master World Championships:
2018 Black Belt Master1 Medium Heavy: 
2018 Black Belt Master1 Open Class:   
2019 Black Belt Master1 Medium Heavy:  
IBJJF Pan American Championships:
2017 Black Belt Medium : 
2018 Black Belt Super Heavy:   
IBJJF Brazilian Nationals Championships:
2017 Black Belt Heavy:  
2017 Black Belt Open Class: 
2018 Black Belt Heavy: 
2018 Black Belt Open Class: 
2019 Black Belt Heavy: 
IBJJF European Championships:
2016 Brown Belt Medium Heavy: 
2016 Brown Belt Open Class: 
2017 Black Belt Heavy: 
2017 Black Belt Open Class:
2018 Black Belt Medium Heavy: 
2018 Black Belt Open Class: 
2019 Black Belt Medium Heavy: 
2019 Black Belt Open Class: 
2020 Black Belt Master1 Heavy: 
2020 Black Belt Master1 Open Class: 
IBJJF Asian Open Championships:
2018 Black Belt Heavy: 
2018 Black Belt Open Class: 
IBJJF Brazilian Nationals NoGi
2019 Black Belt Heavy: 
IBJJF NoGi Worlds Championships
2018 Black Belt Medium Heavy: 
IBJJF European NoGi Championships
2019 Black Belt Heavy: 
IBJJF South Brazilian Championships
2016 Brown Belt Open Class: 
IBJJF South American Championship
2016 Brown Belt Super Heavy: 
2016 Brown Belt Open Class: 
IBJJF Rio Summer Open:
2016 Brown Belt Super Heavy: 
2016 Brown Belt Open Weight: 
2016 NoGi Brown Belt Open Class: 
IBJJF Rio Winter Open:
2016 Brown Belt SuperHeavy: 
2016 Brown Belt Open Class: 
IBJJF Rio Fall Open
2019 Black Belt Open Class:  
IBJJF Curitiba fall Open
2017 Black Belt Open Class: 
2017 NoGi Black Belt Open Class:  
IBJJF Curitiba winter open
2017 Black Belt Heavy: 
2017 Black Belt Open Class: 
2017 NoGi Black Belt Heavy: 
2017 NoGi Black Belt Open Class: 
IBJJF Floripa Open
2017 Black Belt Medium:  
2017 Black Belt Open Class: 
2018 Black Belt Open Class:  
2018 NoGi Black Belt Open Class:  
2019 Black Belt Open Class: 
2019 NoGi Black Belt Super Heavy: 
2019 NoGi Black Belt Open Class: 
IBJJF Belo Horizonte Open
2017 Black Belt Open Class: 
2017 NoGi Black Belt Open Class: 
IBJJF São Paulo Open
2018 Black Belt Medium Heavy: 
2018 Black Belt Open Class:  
2018 NoGi Black Belt Open Class: 
IBJJF Rio BJJ PRO
2016 Brown Belt Open Class: 
IBJJF São Paulo BJJ PRO
2016 Brown Belt Super Heavy: 
2016 Brown Belt Open Class: 
2017 Black Belt Open Class: 
IBJJF Curitiba BJJ PRO
2019 Black Belt Open Class:  
IBJJF Brasília Open
2017 Black Belt Open Class:  
IBJJF Salvador Open
2017 Black Belt Medium Heavy: 
2017 Black Belt Open Class: 
2018 Black Belt Open Class:   
2018 NoGi Black Belt Open Class: 
2019 Black Belt Open Class:  
IBJJF Vitoria Open
2017 NoGi Black Belt Open Class:  
IBJJF México Open
2018 Black Belt Heavy: 
2018 Black Belt Open Class:   
IBJJF Manila Open
2019 Black Belt Super Heavy:  
2019 Black Belt Open Class:  
IBJJF Tel Aviv Open
2019 Black Belt Open Class:  
2019 NoGi Black Belt Open Class:  
IBJJF British Nationals
2017 Black Belt Open Class: 
2018 Black Belt Open Class: 
2018 NoGi Black Belt Open Class: 
IBJJF Spanish Nationals
2017 Black Belt Medium Heavy: 
2017 Black Belt Open Class:   
2017 NoGi Black Belt Open Class: 
2018 Black Belt Open Class:  
IBJJF Madrid Open
2017 Black Belt Open Class:  
2017 NoGi Black Belt Open Class: 
2019 Black Belt Open Class:  
2019 NoGi Black Belt Open Class: 
IBJJF Paris Open
2017 Black Belt Open Class:  
2019 Black Belt Open Class: 
2019 NoGi Black Belt Open Class: 
IBJJF Lisbon Open
2018 Black Belt Open Class: 
2018 NoGi Black Belt Open Class: 
2019 Black Belt Open Class:  
2019 NoGi Black Belt Open Class: 
IBJJF London Fall Open
2018 Black Belt Open Class: 
2019 Black Belt Open Class:  
2019 NoGi Black Belt Open Class: 
IBJJF London Winter Open
2020 Black Belt Super Heavy: 
IBJJF Florence Open
2018 Black Belt Open Class: 
IBJJF Geneve Open
2018 Black Belt Open Class:  
IBJJF Amsterdam Open
2018 Black Belt Open Class: 
2019 Black Belt Open Class: 
IBJJF Rome fall open
2019 Black Belt Open Class: 
IBJJF Dublin open
2019 Black Belt Open Class:  
IBJJF Berlin Open
2019 Black Belt Super Heavy: 
IBJJF Munich Open
2020 Black Belt Super Heavy: 
2019 NoGi Black Belt Super Heavy: 
IBJJF American Nationals
2019 Black Belt Heavy: 
2019 Black Belt Open Class: 
2019 NoGi Black Belt Open Class: 
IBJJF San Diego BJJ PRO
2017 Black Belt Open Class: 
IBJJF Long Beach Open
2017 Black Belt Open Class: 
IBJJF Las Vegas Summer Open
2018 Black Belt Medium Heavy: 
2018 Black Belt Open Class: 
2018 NoGi Black Belt Medium Heavy: 
2018 NoGi Black Belt Open Class:  
2019 Black Belt Heavy:  
2019 NoGi Black Belt Heavy: 
IBJJF Nashville Open
2018 Black Belt Open Class: 
 IBJJF New York Summer Open
2017 Black Belt Open Class: 
IBJJF New York Spring Open
2018 Black Belt Open Class: 
IBJJF New York BJJ PRO
2018 Black Belt Open Class: 
2019 Black Belt Heavy: 
 IBJJF Dallas Spring Open
2018 Black Belt Open Class:  
IBJJF Austin open
2019 Black Belt Super Heavy: 
IBJJF San Antonio Open
2018 Black Belt Heavy: 
IBJJF Boston Spring Open
2018 Black Belt Heavy: 
2018 Black Belt Open Class: 
IBJJF Washington DC Spring Open
2018 Black Belt Open Class:  
2018 NoGi Black Belt Open Class: 
IBJJF Orlando Open
2019 Black Belt Open Class: 
2019 NoGi Black Belt Open Class:  
IBJJF Chicago Open
2018 Black Belt Open Class: 
2018 NoGi Black Belt Open Class:

Personal life

Education
Claudia do Val began her engineering studies in 2010 at CEFET/RJ, but abandoned before graduating when she decided she wanted to do jiu jitsu for a living

Health
Claudia do Val suffered bullying in her younger years which lead to a series of body issues problems and eating disorders including bulimia. She openly spoke about her disorder in 2014 on her Facebook page when she decided to confront the illness and start her recovery.

She suffered a shoulder injury in the beginning of 2016. She underwent surgery in 2018 and claims the injury was never really healed.

Sexual misconduct allegations
Claudia do Val made an allegation of sexual misconduct by her former Brazilian jiu-jitsu coach, in an interview which aired on 3 April 2020 on Paola Diana's YouTube Channel.

References

External links
Claudia do Val on YouTube
Claudia do Val on Facebook
Claudia do Val on Instagram

1988 births
Living people
Female Brazilian jiu-jitsu practitioners
People awarded a black belt in Brazilian jiu-jitsu
Brazilian practitioners of Brazilian jiu-jitsu
Brazilian jiu-jitsu world champions (women)
Sportspeople from Rio de Janeiro (state)